Myrcia costeira is a species of plant in the family Myrtaceae, endemic to the south and south-east of Brazil, and first described in 2015.

Etymology 
The species name refers its coastal forest habitat.

Description 
Myrcia costeira is a tree that grows to between 2 and 12 metres tall. Leaves grow up to 5.4cm long and 2.7cm wide. Fruits are red, up to 10mm wide with up to 3 seeds.

Distribution 
This plant occurs in atlantic forests, between São Paulo (state) and Rio Grande do Sul.

Conservation status 
Myrcia costeira is considered to be vulnerable due to threats to its habitat from urbanisation.

References 

costeira
Tropical fruit
Flora of South America
Endemic flora of Brazil
Fruits originating in South America
Fruit trees
Berries
Plants described in 2015